Upwave, formerly Survata, is a marketing analytics company based in San Francisco, California. It is the leading Analytics Platform that provides software and data to plan, measure and optimize brand marketing. Upwave rebranded from Survata in September 2020. Upwave’s data has been featured in outlets such as: Forbes, CBS News, The New York Times, Los Angeles Times and USA Today. The company rebranded from Survata to Upwave in September 2020.

History 
Upwave was founded by Chris Kelly, former McKinsey consultant and Matrix Partners analyst, who started the company in response to the difficulty he had as a buyer of marketing analytics. Upwave was a member of the Summer 2012 Y Combinator class.

In June 2013, they raised a $1.5 million seed round from PivotNorth Capital and Uncork Capital, and in June 2015 Upwave raised an additional $6 million in a Series A round led by Ridge Ventures, with participation from Bloomberg Beta, and Initialized Capital led by Alexis Ohanian and Garry Tan.  In July 2018, Upwave announced a 14 million Series B led by Conductive Ventures, a venture firm funded by Panasonic.

Acquisitions 
In April of 2021 Upwave spun out its legacy Instant Insights business.

Pro Bono 
Upwave provided pro bono campaign measurement to gauge the overall performance and gather real insights for two Ad Council Campaigns. From August - October 2020 Upwave measured the effectiveness of the Emmy Award winning “Love Has No Labels” campaign. In early 2021 Upwave partnered with Ad Council again, to measure their covid-19 vaccine awareness campaign.

References

Further reading

External links 
 

Market research companies of the United States
Polling companies
American companies established in 2012
Companies based in San Francisco
Y Combinator companies
2012 establishments in California